Jendele is a village on the Tanzanian island of Unguja, part of Zanzibar. It is located in the centre of the island, on the main route between Zanzibar City and Chwaka, to the north of the Jozani-Chwaka Bay National Park.

References
Finke, J. (2006) The Rough Guide to Zanzibar (2nd edition). New York: Rough Guides.

Villages in Zanzibar